The Roman Catholic Diocese of Valparaíso is a suffragan Latin diocese in the ecclesiastical province of Santiago de Chile in central Chile.

Its cathedral episcopal see, the Catedral de Santiago, dedicated to the Apostle St. James the Elder (Spanish: Santiago) in the city of Valparaíso, Valparaíso Province, is a Minor World Heritage Site.

Statistics 
As per 2014, it pastorally served 966,000 Catholics (74.1% of 1,304,000 total) on 4,763 km² in 69 parishes and 260 missions with 171 priests (86 diocesan, 85 religious), 71 deacons, 406 lay religious (133 brothers, 273 sisters) and 16 seminarians.

History 
 Established on November 2, 1872 as Mission “sui iuris” of Valparaíso on territory split off from the Archdiocese of Santiago de Chile
 Promoted on October 18, 1925 to Diocese of Valparaíso
 Lost territory in 1981 to the Diocese of San Felipe
 Gained territory in 2001 from the then Apostolic Vicariate of Araucanía (now Diocese of Villarrica).

Bishops

Bishops of Valparaíso
 Eduardo Gimpert Paut (1925–1937)
 Rafael Lira Infante, (1938–1958)
 Raúl Silva Henríquez, O.S.B. (1959–1961), appointed Archbishop of Santiago de Chile (Cardinal in 1962)
 Emilio Tagle Covarrubias (1961–1983), Archbishop (personal title)
 Francisco de Borja Valenzuela Ríos (1983–1993), Archbishop (personal title)
 Jorge Arturo Medina Estévez (1993–1996), appointed Pro-Prefect, and later Prefect, of the Congregation for Divine Worship and the Discipline of the Sacraments (elevated to Cardinal in 1998)
 Francisco Javier Errázuriz Ossa, I.Sch. (1996–1998), Archbishop (personal title); appointed Archbishop of Santiago de Chile (Cardinal in 2001)
 Gonzalo Duarte García de Cortázar, SS.CC. (1998–2018)
 Jorge Patricio Vega Velasco, S.V.D. (2021–present)

Auxiliary bishops
Francisco Javier Prado Aránguiz, SS.CC. (1988–1993), appointed Bishop of Rancagua
Juan de la Cruz Barros Madrid (1995–2000), appointed Bishop of Iquique
Santiago Jaime Silva Retamales (2002–2015), appointed Bishop of Chile, Militar

Other priests of this diocese who became bishops
Mariano Jaime Casanova Casanova (Vicar General here, 1872–1885), appointed Archbishop of Santiago de Chile in 1886
Salvador Donos Rodríguez (Vicar General here, 1885–1892), never consecrated bishop
Manuel Tomás Mesa (Vicar General here, 1892, did not take effect?)
Ramón Ángel Jara Ruz (Vicar General here, 1894–1898), appointed Bishop of San Carlos de Ancud
José Manuel Santos Ascarza, appointed Bishop of Valdivia in 1955
Francisco Javier Gillmore Stock, appointed Vicar Apostolic of Chile, Military in 1959; consecrated bishop in 1962
Sergio Otoniel Contreras Navia, appointed Bishop of San Carlos de Ancud in 1966
Carlos Marcio Camus Larenas, appointed Bishop of Copiapó in 1968
Gonzalo Arturo Bravo Álvarez, appointed Bishop of San Felipe in 2020

See also 
 List of Catholic dioceses in Chile

Sources and external links 
 GCatholic.org, with Google map and satellite photo - data for all sections
 Catholic Hierarchy
 Diocese website

Roman Catholic dioceses in Chile
Religious organizations established in 1872
Roman Catholic dioceses and prelatures established in the 19th century
Valparaiso, Roman Catholic Diocese of
1872 establishments in Chile